The Aviary is the second studio album by Swedish electronic dance music duo Galantis. It was released on 15 September 2017 through Big Beat Records and Atlantic Records, and features appearances from Throttle, Reece Bullimore, Hook n Sling, ROZES, Hannah Wilson and Wrabel.

On 16 February 2017, the duo released the single "Rich Boy" along with a lyric video directed by We Wrk Wknds. Along with the announcement of the album, it was also announced that the single "Rich Boy" would be excluded from the track list of the album and identified as a non-album single. The album was made available for pre-order on 12 July 2017.

Singles
On 1 April 2016, the pair released the single "No Money", which became their first single to debut on the US Billboard Hot 100. On 5 August 2016, they released the standalone single "Make Me Feel" for the soundtrack to Netflix's original film, XOXO.

On 30 September 2016, Galantis and Hook n Sling released the collaborative single "Love on Me" followed by a music video for the track on 4 October 2016, directed by Dano Cerny. On 15 December 2016, they released a lyric video for "Pillow Fight", which the band has said "brings back the original Galantis heart and roots". On 5 May 2017, the duo released the single "Hunter", to be accompanied by a music video which has already been filmed.

On 8 December 2017, Galantis released "Tell Me You Love Me" as the fifth and final single from the album.

Promotional singles
On 12 July 2017, it was announced on social media that Galantis' second studio album would be titled The Aviary, accompanied by the release of the promotional single titled "True Feeling".
The track "Girls on Boys", a collaboration with American singer-songwriter Rozes, was released as the second promotional single on 1 September 2017 and was revealed on 24 August 2017.

Track listing

Notes

  signifies a co-producer
  signifies an additional producer
  signifies a vocal producer
  signifies a remix producer
 "True Feeling" features lead vocals from Wrabel
 "Hey Alligator" features vocals from Bonnie McKee
 "Tell Me You Love Me" features vocals from Sarah Aarons
 "Hello" features vocals from Leon Jean Marie & Ross Golan
 "Hunter" features lead vocals from Hannah Wilson
 "Call Me Home" features vocals from Sam Martin
 "Love on Me" features vocals from Laura White
 "Pillow Fight" features vocals from Matthew Koma
 "No Money" features vocals from Reece Bullimore

Charts

Certifications

References

2017 albums
Galantis albums